AsianWeek was America's first and largest English language print and on-line publication serving Asian Americans. The news organization played an important role nationally and in the San Francisco Bay Area as the “Voice of Asian America”. It provided news coverage across all Asian ethnic groups.

AsianWeek'''s nature was reflected in its name -- both its weekly frequency and its focus on a pan-ethnic Asian identity, as the only all English publication serving the Asian community.AsianWeek was one of the newspapers owned and operated by the Fang family of San Francisco, with others including the San Francisco Independent and the San Francisco Examiner. It was founded by John Fang in 1979 and helmed by long-time AsianWeek President James Fang from 1993-2009.AsianWeek headquarters were located in San Francisco's Chinatown. It stopped publishing a weekly print edition in 2009, and on-line publication ceased in 2012. AsianWeek still publishes occasional special editions and community organizing activity has continued with the AsianWeek Foundation.

 History AsianWeek was the largest and longest established English language newsweekly for Asian Pacific Americans. In 1965, after the Hart-Celler Immigration Act ended over 80 years of race-based exclusion of immigrants from Asia, the United States for the first time experienced an influx of Asian immigration.  From a total of 878,000 Asians in America in 1960, to U.S. Census estimates of 21.4 million in 2016, more than 95% of Asian Pacific Islanders would arrive or be born in the United States after passage of the 1965 Immigration Act.

Realizing the need to provide a voice for this newly emerging Asian Pacific America, John Fang, founded AsianWeek newspaper in 1979 in San Francisco. Prior to AsianWeek, Fang was editor and publisher of the Young China Daily, a Chinese-language newspaper affiliated with Taiwan’s then-Nationalist government. Fang had also published the Chinatown Handy Guide in multiple U.S. cities. Over two years of planning before AsianWeek's pilot issue was published in August 1979, Fang’s brain trust included legendary Chinatown publicist H. K. Wong, writer Charles Leong, former aide to Congressman Phil Burton (and the first Chinese Postmaster of a U.S. city) Lim P. Lee, and society columnist Carolyn Gan.

The newspaper started as all-subscription based and has always been published in tabloid size format. In 1995 AsianWeek was redesigned as a newspaper magazine-style tabloid with full color cover and color graphics throughout. The paper also went to free distribution and launched its website, www.asianweek.com, the following year. AsianWeek reached its high mark in circulation of 58,000 copies in 2003.

In November 2004, AsianWeek celebrated its 25th Anniversary of publication. “For the last 25 years, AsianWeek has been the mirror of our community, showing our triumphs and shortcomings, serving as both the face and conscience of Asian America”, AsianWeek President James Fang wrote in his commemorative essay.  “AsianWeek has acted as a forum in advocating for those Asian Americans who were defenseless and voiceless in the face of an uncaring power. Whether it was in bringing much-needed national and decisive exposure to the killing of Vincent Chin or in demanding justice for Wen Ho Lee and Capt. James Yee, the strength of AsianWeek has been its unequivocal eagerness to support our community.”

On August 20, 2007, AsianWeek launched a completely redesigned version of their website that is no longer live as of April 2011.

In March of 2008, the AsianWeek Foundation was launched as a sister entity for organizing in the Asian community. In January 2009, AsianWeek ceased operations. AsianWeek Foundation community work continued, and occasional special sections are still published today, for example during Asian Pacific Heritage Month in May and in collaboration with organizations like AARP.

Editorial FocusAsian Week provided “a documentary record of many important events that have affected the Asian American community.” 
Coverage of Asian American issues included the killing of Vincent Chin, Asian American college admissions, and quotas on Chinese students in competitive San Francisco school assignments.

Activism in politics
One of the paper’s most important focus areas for editorial coverage and advocacy was to increase representation of Asian Pacific Islanders in elected office. The front page of AsianWeek's premier issue  blasted the headline “Democrats and Republicans Voice the Same Opinion: It’s time for More Asian Americans to Enter Politics.”

Beginning in 1984, AsianWeek began attending and covering the Democratic and Republican National Conventions every four years. AsianWeek's coverage was bipartisan including the publication of special sections for each of the political party’s conventions. AsianWeek was often the only Asian media outlet to conduct exclusive interviews with the eventual presidential party nominees.

After the 1996 Democratic National Convention in Chicago, AsianWeek launched the Potstickers column written by Samson Wong as the first American political insider column focusing on Asian Pacific Islanders.

U.S Census
In 1977, the same year Fang began making plans for AsianWeek, the United States Office of Management and Budget ordered the U.S. Census Bureau and federal agencies to create a pan-ethnic Asian category, “Asian or Pacific Islander”. Prior to that, data was only collected in five sub-categories  (Chinese, Japanese, Filipino, Korean, and Hawaiian). As the 1980 U.S. Census results were released, AsianWeek offered extensive editorial coverage in its pages which included special sections full of tables and figures.AsianWeek continued its focus on Asian Pacific Islander demographics throughout the publication’s history. After the 1990 Census, AsianWeek published a booklet, Asians in America: 1990 Census. In the spring of 2003,AsianWeek partnered with the University of California at Los Angeles’ Asian American studies department to co-publish a book focused on 2000 U.S. Census data, titled The new Face of Asian Pacific America:  Numbers, Diversity, and Change in the 21st Century.

Asians in American society
Much of AsianWeek's coverage highlighted Asian Pacific Islanders participating in all the different aspects of American society. As AsianWeek's Editor-in-chief Samson Wong (2001-2008) described it: “Beyond our common history and heritage, we’re also looking to identify our common futures as citizens in this country.”AsianWeek often published features or special sections on Asian American involvement in specific fields, for example, “Asian Americans going for the Gold” in the 2004 Olympic games; “Asian American War Heroes”, a listing of all the Asian Americans killed in action from the Afghanistan war, and “The 25 Most Influential APA Hollywood Pioneers". AsianWeek covered the founding of many Asian American organizations such as the National Asian Pacific American Women’s Forum. AsianWeek also helped start the National Association of Asian Publishers which was founded on the sidelines of the Newspaper Association of America annual marketing conference in 2008.

Books published by AsianWeek include the New Faces of Asian Pacific America (see above), and Amok, a compilation of columnist Emil Guillermo, which won the American Book Award in 2000.

 Major sections 

 Opinion 

The Opinion section included AsianWeek's Letters to the Editor, Emil Guillermo's column "Amok", and a community contributed article, "Voices".

Emil Guillermo has been a journalist for more than 30 years. After ten years in television news, Guillermo became host of NPR's All Things Considered, in 1989. After leaving NPR, Guillermo worked as press secretary and speechwriter for then congressman Norman Mineta. He returned to media as a local television and radio talk show host in Washington, D.C., Sacramento, and San Francisco. As a writer, Guillermo has contributed jokes for Jay Leno's monologues. His written often satirical commentaries have appeared in newspapers throughout the country. His book, published by AsianWeek Amok, is a compilation of his columns and won the American Book Award in 2000.  Guillermo is also the winner of both a California Newspaper Publishers Association Award and a National Inland Press Association Award for his mainstream newspaper work. He has won awards from the Radio-TV News  Directors Association, Society of Professional Journalists, the Asian American Journalists Association, and has been nominated for local TV Emmy Awards. A native San Franciscan, Guillermo graduated from Lowell High School and Harvard College.

On Monday, February 4, 2008, AsianWeek launched a new daily blog by Guillermo. Guillermo is already the most widely read APA columnist, and his new daily commentary will remark on timely and fascinating stories and ideas that affect the broad APA community.

“It will be a place readers can get my take on the issues that concern them”, said Guillermo, whose column, “Amok” has appeared in AsianWeek over the last 14 years.  “And it will be a place where they can share their ideas with others. Consider it the water cooler for APAs across the country”.

 Nation and World 

The Nation and World section included "Washington Journal" authored by columnist Phil Tajitsu Nash. It covered topics such as the 2008 Summer Olympics Torch Relay protests in San Francisco to national issues that affect the Asian American community.

Nash is the CEO and co-founder of Nash Interactive. He has provided commentary to BBC World News radio and other news outlets, and served as host of a nationally broadcast weekly public radio program reporting on the U.S. Supreme Court. Nash practiced law in New York and New Jersey, and taught law at Georgetown University Law Center. He testified before the United States Congress on behalf of the Japanese American redress movement, and has also served as a strategist, lobbyist, and litigator.

 Bay and California 

Headquartered in San Francisco, California, AsianWeek dedicated a section to issues and timely news items that are relevant to the Bay Area's Asian American community.

 Arts and Entertainment 

The Arts and Entertainment section included "Asian Eats", "AskQ" and "The Yin-Yang with Lisa Lee".

Asian Eats column provided an inside look at the Bay Area's Asian American cuisine. Formerly known as "Picky Eater" the column covers price, environment, customer service, cleanliness, menu selection, and taste of the Bay Area's most popular restaurants.AsianWeek's AskQ was an advice column to reflect everyday life in Asian Pacific America. It included readers’ questions and solicited queries. Q is a 30-something urban male who is "happily partnered—a manager by profession, a writer by desire", according to the column.

The "Yin-Yang" column was authored by Lisa Lee, an AsianWeek columnist.= who offered "a provocative look into the arts and entertainment industry. The Yin-yang Blog brings you up to date with Asian-American celebrity news, gossip and more."

Community EventsAsianWeek newspaper is also involved in a wide array of community activities. Committed to promoting and participating in events that celebrate the diversity the Asian-American community, the publication plays an active role in sponsoring and hosting community events, spreading health awareness on Hepatitis B, and promoting cross-cultural and interracial cooperation with major outdoor events in San Francisco, including the Castro Street Fair, Chinatown Autumn Moon Festival Street Fair, Haight-Ashbury Street Fair and Nihonmachi Street Fair.  AsianWeek is also on the planning committee for the Asian Heritage Street Celebration, Northern California Cherry Blossom Festival, and Pistahan Filipino Parade and Festival.

 Controversies 

 Kenneth EngAsianWeek was severely criticized for publishing Why I Hate Blacks on February 23, 2007, a column by freelance writer Kenneth Eng.  Prior to this incident, AsianWeek published other inflammatory race-themed columns by Eng, including: Proof that Whites Inherently Hate Us and Why I Hate Asians. Several Asian-American organizations called for an apology, as well as a repudiation of the columnist and his views, and circulated an online petition to that effect.AsianWeek published a front-page apology in its February 28 issue, severed all ties with Eng, held various public forums, and declared that it was reviewing its editorial policy.  AsianWeek also published in its March 16 issue of "Voices" an article titled "I'm Afraid and Feel Helpless" to tacitly repudiate all of Kenneth Eng's work without making any statements of its own that could add fuel to the fire. Then in late March 2007, AsianWeek'' quietly made editorial staff changes, evidenced in the masthead of its March 30 issue.  Former editor-in-chief Samson Wong's title became Senior Editorial Consultant and Ted Fang, formerly editor-at-large, became Editor and Publisher.

References

External links 

 
 
 

Asian-American culture in California
Asian-American mass media
Newspapers established in 1979
Publications disestablished in 2009
Newspapers published in San Francisco
Asian-American press
Online newspapers with defunct print editions
Chinatown, San Francisco
1979 establishments in California
Weekly newspapers published in California